The Dresden Trumpeter is a breed of fancy pigeon developed over many years of selective breeding.

Origin
Saxony, in the region of Dresden.

Overall Impression
Only slightly sturdier than the Field Pigeon, low carriage, a rather long than short effect required. White wing shield. Double-crested.
 Head: Not quite so powerful as the double-crested Trumpeter. The shell crest should be broad and unbroken. The beak crest should be somewhat oval in shape, as unbroken as possible all round; the larger, forward part covering the beak wattles and requiring some foundation to avoid unsightly hanging.
 Eyes: Dark orange iris, somewhat lighter iris allowed in reds and yellows. Cere fine, flesh-coloured.
 Beak: Dark in blacks, flesh-coloured in reds and yellows; in reds a somewhat darker tinge is permitted.
 Neck: Short, fairly rounded, throat full, rounded.
 Breast:  Broad as possible, full and pressed well forward.
 Back:  Fairly broad at the shoulder, slightly sloping.
 Wings: Fairly broad, with long primaries reaching almost to the end of the tail.
 Tail: Long.
 Legs: Thighs well feathered. Feet thick and full-muffed. However, muff feathers should not be excessively long. Muffs must spread to the side rather than to the front.

Colours
Red and yellow, very occasionally black.

Markings
White wing shields. All other feathers coloured.

Defects
Thin or weak body, upright stance; too much of a blue tinge in the colouring, white feathers in the primaries, muffs, tail, thighs and head; distorted beak crest; narrow, distorted or incomplete shell crest; muffs which are too short or full of gaps. 
Order of Evaluation: Overall Impression - body size - carriage - markings - head adornment.

See also 
List of pigeon breeds

References

External links

Pigeon breeds
Pigeon breeds originating in Germany